Konstantinos Bembis (born 1903, date of death unknown) was a Greek Olympic fencer. He competed at the 1928, 1936 and 1948 Summer Olympics.

References

1903 births
Year of death missing
Greek male fencers
Olympic fencers of Greece
Fencers at the 1928 Summer Olympics
Fencers at the 1936 Summer Olympics
Fencers at the 1948 Summer Olympics
Sportspeople from Athens